Subodha Kumar is the Paul R. Anderson Distinguished Chair Professor of Statistics, Operations, and Data Science (with secondary appointment in Information Systems) at the Fox School of Business, Temple University. He founded the Center for Business Analytics and Disruptive Technologies at Temple University. He is also the Concentration Director for Ph.D. Program in Operations and Supply Chain Management. 

Kumar is the Deputy Editor for the Production and Operations Management journal, a journal in the field of operations and supply chain management. He is the Founding Executive Editor of the Management and Business Review journal. Kumar's research expertise lies in the areas of web advertising. On this topic, he has authored a book titled Optimization Issues in Web and Mobile Advertising: Past and Future Trends, which summarizes the state of the art research on the web and mobile advertising. He has also co-authored a book titled Social Media Analytics and Practical Applications: The Change to the Competition Landscape, which illustrates how social media analytics can help firms build transformational strategies and cope with the challenges of social media technology. He has co-authored other book chapters. Kumar's research interests include artificial Intelligence, machine learning, blockchain, fintech, healthcare, social media and web analytics, operations and supply chain management, software management and cybersecurity, sequencing and scheduling.

Kumar has received several awards for research, teaching, and service to the academic community. He has been invited by media to provide expert opinion on matters related to social media, marketing, and business management.

Education and academic career 
Kumar was born in India where he received his Bachelor of Mechanical Engineering from BIT Sindri, India. He later went on to get his masters in Industrial and Management Engineering from Indian Institute of Technology Kanpur. He received his MBA and PhD (2001) in Management Sciences and Information Systems from University of Texas, Dallas.

Kumar started his academic career as an Assistant Professor of Information Systems at Foster School of Business, University of Washington. He later joined Mays Business School at Texas A&M University in 2009, where he held Mays Research Fellow (2012), Shelley and Joe Tortorice '70 Faculty Research Fellow (2012 – 2013), and Carol and G. David Van Houten, Jr. '71 Professorship (2013 – 2017).

Kumar presently is the Paul R. Anderson Distinguished Chair Professor of Statistics, Operations, and Data Science at the Fox School of Business, Temple University. He also has secondary appointment in Information Systems. He is the Founding Director of the Center for Business Analytics and Disruptive Technologies at Temple University. He is also the Concentration Director for Ph.D. Program in Operations and Supply Chain Management.

Patent 
Kumar holds a patent (United States Patent # 6,556,893, approved on April 29, 2003) on “Robotic System Control.”

Writing

Books 
 Kumar is the author of Optimization Issues in Web and Mobile Advertising: Past and Future Trends, which summarizes the state of the art research on the web and mobile advertising.

 Kumar is the co-author of Social Media Analytics and Practical Applications: The Change to the Competition Landscape, which illustrates how social media analytics can help firms build transformational strategies and cope with the challenges of social media technology.

Journal and Refereed Conference Publications 
 Kumar has published more than 75 papers in scientific journals including Operations Research, Management Science, Information Systems Research, Production and Operations Management, MIS Quarterly, Manufacturing & Service Operations Management, Journal of Operations Management, Journal of Management Information Systems, Decision Sciences, IIE Transactions, European Journal of Operational Research, and Journal of Scheduling. 

 Kumar's work has been published in more than 110 peer-reviewed conference proceedings.

Case Studies and Book Chapters 
 Kumar has co-authored several business-school case studies in the domain of operations, supply chain management, and information systems.

 Kumar has also co-authored multiple book chapters.

Editorial Positions
Kumar holds and has held several editorial positions at premier scientific journals including Deputy Editor for Production and Operations Management Journal. He founded the POM-IS Interface Department at Production and Operations Management Journal and is the department editor. He co-founded the Disruptive Technologies and Operations Management Department at Production and Operations Management Journal and is currently the co-department editor. Kumar is also the Founding Executive Editor of the Management and Business Review Journal.

Board Member

 Board Member, Insightzz (http://insightzz.com/) Advisory Board

 Board Member, Heal Advisory Board

 Faculty Area Advisor, Operations-Economics Interface, Indian Institute of Management (IIM), Udaipur

 Board Member, Journal of Blockchain Research Advisory Board

 Advisory Council Member, INFORMS Service Science Section

 Board Member, Srini Raju Centre for IT and The Networked Economy (SRITNE) Advisory Board, Indian School of Business

 Associate Executive Director of Production and Operations Management Society (POMS) Information Technology Services

Honors and awards
Kumar has received several honors for his scholarship and service to the academic society. 

 Production and Operations Management Society Fellow, which is considered to be Production and Operations Management Society’s highest recognition. 

 Instituted “The Subodha Kumar and Geoffrey G. Parker Award for Research on Digital Transformation” by the Management and Business Review. 

 Sushil K. Gupta Production and Operations Management Society (POMS) Distinguished Service Award for his service to the academic society. 

 Association of Former Students University Level Distinguished Achievement Award in Teaching, Texas A&M University, 2016. This award is among the most prestigious awards at Texas A&M University.

 Selected as the 'Professor of the Year' for Core Courses by the ISB PGP Classes of 2021 and 2022, Hyderabad Campus, Indian School of Business. 

 Ranked #1 worldwide in terms of publications in Information Systems Research in 2016-2019.

 Ranked #1 worldwide in terms of publications in Information Systems Research in 2015-2018.

 Erdős Number 3: List of people by Erdős number

References

External links 
 Web Page of Prof. Subodha Kumar
 Department Page
 Production and Operations Management Journal
 Management and Business Review Journal

Temple University faculty
University of Washington faculty
Texas A&M University faculty
IIT Kanpur alumni
Living people
1975 births